Karel Třešňák (born February 21, 1949 in Karlovy Vary) is a former Czechoslovak slalom canoeist who competed in the 1970s. He won seven medals at the ICF Canoe Slalom World Championships with two golds (C-1 team: 1973, 1975) a silver (C-1: 1973) and four bronzes (C-1: 1977; C-1 team: 1971, 1977, 1979).

Třešňák also finished seventh in the C-1 event at the 1972 Summer Olympics in Munich.

References

1949 births
Canoeists at the 1972 Summer Olympics
Czechoslovak male canoeists
Olympic canoeists of Czechoslovakia
Living people
Medalists at the ICF Canoe Slalom World Championships
Sportspeople from Karlovy Vary